Lusungo is an administrative ward in the Kyela district of the Mbeya Region of Tanzania. In 2016 the Tanzania National Bureau of Statistics report there were 7,003 people in the ward, from 6,354 in 2012.

Villages / vitongoji 
The ward has 5 villages and 17 vitongoji.

 Kikuba
 Isyeto
 Lufumbi
 Malangali
 Lukama
 Igembe
 Lukama Chini
 Lukama Kati
 Lukwego
 Bulimbwe
 Kaposo
 Lukwego
 Lusungo
 Bugema
 Bugogo
 Lusungo
 Mpulo
 Ntundumano
 Ntundumbaka
 Mpanda
 Kapugi
 Malema

References 

Wards of Mbeya Region